Mary Fennelly (Máire Ní Fhionnalaigh) was the 19th president of the Camogie Association.

Family background
She is first cousin of the Fennelly family from Ballyhale, of whose seven brothers four played together to win the 1989 Leinster Senior Club Hurling Championship and four (Kevin, Seán, Ger and Liam) played together in the All Ireland hurling final of 1987.

Career
She won three All Ireland medals with Kilkenny in 1974, 1976 (when she captained the team), and 1977 (when she won the Kilkenny camogie sports star award) and All Ireland club medals with St Paul's. She won colleges medals with Presentation Secondary School, Kilkenny in the first two years of the competition, 1968 and 1969. In the early 1970s, while in Dublin, she played with Naomh Aoife. She retired as a player in 1980.

Administration
She first chaired the Kilkenny camogie board while still a player in 1976, seeing affiliations in the county grow at all levels and organising Féile na nGael in Kilkenny in 1978 and 1979. She organised the centenary golf event of the Camogie Association in 2004.

References

Mary
Presidents of the Camogie Association
Kilkenny camogie players
Year of birth missing (living people)
Living people
Place of birth missing (living people)